A Happy Divorce is a 1975 Danish-French drama film directed by Henning Carlsen. It was entered into the 1975 Cannes Film Festival.  won a Bodil Award for Best Actress in a Supporting Role for Sylvie.

Cast 
 Jean Rochefort as Jean-Baptiste Morin
 André Dussollier as François
 Daniel Ceccaldi as Antoine
 Bulle Ogier as Marguerite
 Bernadette Lafont as Jacqueline, l'infirmière
  as Sylvie
 Étienne Bierry as Pierre

References

External links 
 

1975 drama films
1975 films
Danish drama films
1970s Danish-language films
Films about divorce
Films directed by Henning Carlsen
French drama films
1970s French-language films
1975 multilingual films
Danish multilingual films
French multilingual films
1970s French films